Petrochromis famula is a species of cichlid endemic to Lake Tanganyika on rocky substrates on which they can graze. It can be found in the aquarium trade.

References

External links 
 Photograph

famula
Taxa named by Hubert Matthes
Taxa named by Ethelwynn Trewavas
Fish described in 1960
Taxonomy articles created by Polbot